RC15 is the working title of an upcoming Indian Telugu-language political thriller action film  directed by S. Shankar (in his Telugu debut) from a story by Karthik Subbaraj. Produced by Dil Raju and Sirish under Sri Venkateswara Creations, the film stars Ram Charan in a dual role with Kiara Advani, Anjali, S. J. Suryah and Jayaram in the lead roles.

The film was announced in February 2021 and began its production in October 2021. Filming took place in Hyderabad, Visakhapatnam, Andhra Pradesh, Maharashtra and Punjab. It features music composed by S. Thaman with cinematography by Tirru and R. Rathnavelu.

Cast

Production

Development 
In February 2021, it was announced that Shankar and Ram Charan were collaborating for a film produced by Dil Raju and Sirish. The film marks Shankar's directorial debut in Telugu cinema. They began with the working title of RC15 as it is intended to be 15th film of Charan as a lead actor. It is also referred to as SVC50 as it marks the 50th production venture of Sri Venkateswara Creations. In January 2022, in an interview with Cinema Vikatan, filmmaker Karthik Subbaraj revealed that he wrote the film's original story with Shankar writing the screenplay. Sai Madhav Burra contributed the dialogues. Shameer Muhammed was roped in for editing. Charan reportedly plays a dual role as a father and son.

Cast and crew 
In July 2021 it was announced that Kiara Advani was signed on to be the lead actress which marks her second collaboration with Charan after Vinaya Vidheya Rama. Anjali was cast in a pivotal role, while Sunil, Srikanth, Jayaram, and Naveen Chandra were all confirmed to be a part of the film. In February 2022, S. J. Suryah was approached for a crucial role and was later confirmed to be part of the film in September 2022.

Tirru is signed as the cinematographer who worked for four schedules. When Tirru was unavailable for personal reasons, he was temporarily replaced by R. Rathnavelu.

Filming 
The film was formally launched with a muhurat shot on 8 September 2021 at Annapurna Studios in Hyderabad with a traditional pooja ceremony attended by Ranveer Singh, Chiranjeevi, and S. S. Rajamouli.

Principal photography began on 22 October 2021 and the first schedule was completed in the first week of November. Filming took place in Maharashtra at Pune, Satara and Phaltan. Later that month, a song was shot for 10 days, at a specially erected set in Ramoji Film City. The song, which also included international dancers, was choreographed by Jani Master. Anbariv and others were hired to design these action sequences in the film.

The third schedule for the film commenced in February 2022. Planned for about 20 days, the shoot take place in Andhra Pradesh at Rajahmundry, Kakinada, Kovvur and other nearby places of West Godavari and East Godavari districts. Later the same month, it was reported that filming for Indian 2, also directed by Shankar for which the production was halted for two and a half years, would take place after wrapping up RC15 shoot. Charan took a break from filming to take part in RRR film's success celebrations, and returned to shooting in April. Charan and Advani began a 20-day schedule at Amritsar in April to shoot college portions. Due to scheduling conflicts, R. Rathnavelu joined the unit in Amritsar to complete these portions in place of Tirru. In May, the crew shot a schedule in Visakhapatnam.

By July 2022, 60% of the filming was completed with the director intending to wrap up filming by December. Earlier the same month, a massive song involving around 1000 dancers was shot in Punjab and Hyderabad. After the song shoot, an action sequence involving 1200 fighters was planned. In August, Shankar confirmed that he would be shooting simultaneously for both RC15 and Indian 2. The filming for RC15 was planned to resume in early September in Hyderabad and Visakhapatnam. In November 2022, 10 days of schedule happened in New Zealand where the team picturized an expensive song across multiple exotic locations in New Zealand.

In February 2023, filming was resumed with few scenes shot at Gandhi Institute of Technology and Management, Visakhapatnam followed by Simhachalam and Charminar. Few pictures containing scenes from the set were leaked online, during the filming at the university.

Music 
The film's soundtrack and score is composed by Thaman S in his third collaboration with Charan after Naayak and Bruce Lee and first musical collaboration along with his second overall collaboration with Shankar after acting in Boys.

Release 
In January 2022, Dil Raju expressed his intentions to release the film in January 2023 to coincide with Sankranthi. However, the film is reportedly pushed back to the second half of 2023 to accommodate Raju's Tamil-language production Varisu and also due to production delays. The film will release in Telugu along with dubbed versions in Tamil and Hindi.

References

External links 
 

2020s political drama films
2023 films
2023 drama films
Films directed by S. Shankar
Films scored by Thaman S
Films shot at Ramoji Film City
Films shot in Andhra Pradesh
Films shot in Hyderabad, India
Films shot in Maharashtra
Films shot in Mumbai
Films shot in Rajahmundry
Indian political drama films
Upcoming films
Upcoming Indian films
Upcoming Telugu-language films
Films shot in Punjab, India